The Rebel may refer to:

Entertainment

Literature
 The Rebel (book), a 1951 book-length essay by Albert Camus
 "The Rebel" (poem), poem by Padraic Pearse
 The Rebel, novel by H. C. Bailey
 The Rebel (art magazine), British art magazine established in 1985

Music 
 The Rebel, the moniker under which Ben Wallers of Country Teasers records and performs solo
 "The Rebel", a song recorded by Johnny Cash in the late 1950s, theme music for the TV Western of the same name

Playacting 
 The Rebel (1915 film), directed by J.E. Mathews and starring Allen Doone, from the play The Rebels  by James B. Fagan
 The Rebel (1931 film), a French film directed by Adelqui Migliar
 The Rebel (1932 film), a German film directed by Edwin H. Knopf, Curtis Bernhardt and Luis Trenker
 The Rebel (1933 film), an English-language version of the 1932 film directed by Edwin H. Knopf and Luis Trenker and starring Luis Trenker, Vilma Bánky and Victor Varconi
 The Rebel (1961 film), a 1961 film starring British comedian Tony Hancock
 The Rebel (1980 French film), a French film directed by Gérard Blain
 The Rebel (1980 Italian film), an Italian film starring Maurizio Merli
 The Rebel (1993 film), an Italian film starring Penélope Cruz, known in Italian as La ribelle
 The Rebel (2007 film), a Vietnamese film starring Johnny Nguyen
 The Rebel (1964 play), directed by Patrick Garland
 The Rebel (American TV series), an American western television series
 The Rebel (British TV series), a 2016 British sitcom
 The Rebel (South Korean TV series), a 2017 series

Journalism
 The Rebel (anarchist magazine), American anarchist magazine published 1895 to 1896
 Rebel News, a Canadian Internet and YouTube television channel founded by Ezra Levant

See also
 Rebel (disambiguation)
 The Rebels (disambiguation)